The 1896 County Championship was the seventh officially organised running of the County Championship, and ran from 4 May to 31 August 1896. Yorkshire County Cricket Club claimed victory that year, winning 16 of their 26 matches and losing only three. Five of Yorkshire's players made over 1,000 runs in the season, including John Brown who was placed third nationally, while Yorkshireman Bobby Peel was sixth highest wicket taker and Schofield Haigh held one of the leading bowling averages. Although Yorkshire had a crop of players accruing these statistics, Kumar Shri Ranjitsinhji of Sussex took the plaudits for the most runs that year, 1,698, at the highest average, 58.55, while Surrey's Tom Richardson took the most wickets – 191, and William Attewell of Nottinghamshire returned the best average – 14.63 for his 87 wickets.

Highlights

The highest team total during 1896 was 887, made by Yorkshire against Warwickshire at Edgbaston, composed of centuries from Stanley Jackson (117), Ted Wainwright (136), Bobby Peel (210*) and Lord Hawke (166). The latter two were both career bests. In contrast, the lowest team total was 45 when Surrey were routed by only two Middlesex bowlers. WG Grace's 301 against Sussex was the highest score of the season, while there were three hat-tricks for Richardson, Jack Hearne and Walter Mead. Richardson also took the season's best match figures, 15/113 against Leicestershire, while Mead took 9/75 – the best innings figures of the season.

Table
 One point was awarded for a win, and one point was taken away for each loss. Final placings were decided by dividing the number of points earned by the number of completed matches (i.e. those that ended in win or loss), and multiplying by 100.

Leading averages

Notes

External links
1895 County Championship  at CricketArchive

1896 in English cricket
County Championship seasons
County